Most of Texas is in the Central Time Zone with the exception being the two westernmost counties.
El Paso County
Hudspeth County 
Northwestern Culberson County near Guadalupe Mountains National Park unofficially observes Mountain Time Zone.

IANA time zone database
The 2 zones for Texas as given by zone.tab of the IANA time zone database. Columns marked * are from the zone.tab.

Historical

The "Panhandle and Plains" section of Texas is now in the Central Time Zone, but had a two-year period of being in the Mountain Time Zone between 1919 and 1921.

See also
 Time in the United States

References

Texas
Geography of Texas